Jack Geggie (29 October 1881 – 20 January 1973) was an Australian rules footballer who played for Essendon and Melbourne in the Victorian Football League (VFL).

Although he started his career at Victorian Football Association (VFA) club North Melbourne as a forward and follower, Geggie was used as a defender during his time with Essendon. He appeared as a full-back in the 1902 VFL Grand Final, when Essendon was comprehensively defeated by Collingwood. The following two seasons, he represented the league at interstate football.

Geggie returned to the VFA in 1906, as captain-coach of Richmond. He only remained in that role a year and later, after a stint at Melbourne, captain-coached Oakleigh.

References

Holmesby, Russell and Main, Jim (2007). The Encyclopedia of AFL Footballers. 7th ed. Melbourne: Bas Publishing.

1881 births
1973 deaths
Essendon Football Club players
Melbourne Football Club players
North Melbourne Football Club (VFA) players
Richmond Football Club (VFA) players
Oakleigh Football Club players
Oakleigh Football Club coaches
Australian rules footballers from Melbourne
People from Richmond, Victoria